K.K. Radhamohan is an Indian film producer in Telugu cinema. In 2009, he ventured into film production under his production company, Sri Sathya Sai Arts.

Filmography

As producer

References

Telugu film producers
Film producers from Hyderabad, India
Living people
Year of birth missing (living people)